The A78 is an A road in Scotland.  It connects Greenock and Prestwick on a route which follows the northern section of the Ayrshire coast.

Route

The A78 begins in Greenock, Renfrewshire as a continuation of the A8 road at the Bull Ring roundabout, and runs in a southerly direction through the Spango Valley, Inverkip, Wemyss Bay, Largs, Seamill and then bypasses the major towns of Ardrossan, Irvine and Troon amongst others before terminating near Prestwick, Ayrshire, where it forms a junction with the A77.

Infrastructure

Much of the road is single carriageway – both for a short distance through Greenock and a 21-mile stretch between Inverkip and Ardrossan.

The rest is dual carriageway – between the Eglinton and Warrix interchanges there are in fact 3 lanes in each direction, and the road is constructed to motorway  standard (with full grade separation at junctions) save for a lack of hard shoulders. The road very rarely appears busy on this stretch – the adjacent New Town development area of Irvine, North Ayrshire (which includes Kilwinning, Dreghorn and Girdle Toll) had a population of just over 50,000 in the 2001 census; the town planners designed the infrastructure for a population more in the region of 120,000.

Recent improvements

Until December 2004, the route of the A78 went through the "three towns" – namely Ardrossan, Saltcoats and Stevenston. The result was a highly congested section with numerous traffic lights making progress slow. To counter this a bypass was constructed with two additional entrance/exit points other than the ends in the form of roundabouts.

The section at the Ardrossan end is a single carriageway road with a climbing lane. The other two sections are dual carriageway with two lanes in each direction.

The existence of the bypass meant that the section through the towns previously labelled A78 became a continuation of the A738 which previously formed a concurrency with the A78 through Stevenston before diverging to form Boglemart Street and subsequently many other streets in Saltcoats and Ardrossan. Many sources available today still don't acknowledge these changes, for example "Google Maps".

The new road can easily take 10 minutes off any journey which would otherwise involve travelling through the three towns and as a result has proven very popular amongst people who make such journeys – for example people from Largs and West Kilbride to the north who now have swifter access to the shopping facilities of Irvine and Ayr and the Morrisons supermarket at Stevenston, as well as any football fans who may be travelling to watch Kilmarnock FC.

Flooding

Flooding is common during periods of high winds combined with a high tide on the coastal stretch between Largs and Skelmorlie. For this reason, closure gates are located at both the north end of Largs and the south end of Skelmorlie.

When the road is closed traffic between Largs and Greenock is often diverted along narrow country lanes with little room to pass any oncoming traffic. This has been known to cause widespread delays.

In popular culture

A fictional insect-petting business operating from a disused warehouse on the A78 is a key location in fictional horror paperback-writer Nick Steen's giant insect-themed novel The Stealth-Hive Parallax in Garth Merenghi's TerrorTome.

References

Roads in Scotland
Transport in Inverclyde
Transport in North Ayrshire
Transport in South Ayrshire
Greenock
Largs
Kilwinning
Irvine, North Ayrshire
Troon
Prestwick